Graft is a 1931 American pre-Code thriller film, directed by Christy Cabanne, starring Regis Toomey and future talent agent Sue Carol, and featuring Boris Karloff, who appeared in Frankenstein during the same year.

Cast
 Regis Toomey as Dusty Hotchkiss
 Sue Carol as Constance Hall
 Dorothy Revier as Pearl Vaughan
 Boris Karloff as Joe Terry
 George Irving as Robert Hall
 Richard Tucker as Carter Harrison
 William B. Davidson as M.H. Thomas
 Willard Robertson as Scudder
 Harold Goodwin as Speed Hansen
 Carmelita Geraghty as Secretary

External links

1931 films
1930s thriller films
American black-and-white films
Films directed by Christy Cabanne
Films produced by Samuel Bischoff
Universal Pictures films
American thriller films
1930s English-language films
1930s American films